The Peugeot EX1 Concept is an electric concept roadster introduced and made by the French automaker Peugeot, presented at the 2010 Paris Motor Show.

Overview 
As part of Peugeot’s 200th anniversary celebrations, the brand’s design offices wanted to create an electrically powered concept car.

Design 
Previous concept cars from Peugeot have been the Asphalte and 20Cup. The EX1 is a 2-door roadster that is shaped like a “water droplet”, with a rear section built around two closely set rear wheels.

The EX1 features stylistic design codes first presented on the SR1 concept in earlier 2010. The monocoque body structure is manufactured from a carbon/honeycomb composite to optimize weight and rigidity.

Performance
From a standing start, the EX1 set the following times: 1/8 mile (8.89s), 1/4 mile (14.4s), 500m (16.81s), 1/2 mile (23.85s), 1000m (28.16s), and 1 mile (41.09s).

References

External links 
 Concept EX1 at Peugeot's official site.

EX1
Cars introduced in 2010
All-wheel-drive vehicles
Production electric cars
Green racing
Roadsters